Donvale is a suburb of Melbourne, Victoria, Australia,  east of Melbourne's Central Business District, located within the City of Manningham local government area.

History

Donvale Post Office opened on 16 September 1929 and closed in 1972. It now houses the Donvale Historical Society

Donvale is named after the two roads that border the suburb. Doncaster Road and Springvale Road.

Demographics

In the 2016 census, the population of Donvale was 12,347. Of this population 52.3% were female and 47.7% were male. The median/average age of the population was is 44 years of age.

Nearly two-thirds (63.4%) of people living in Donvale were born in Australia. The other top responses for country of birth were China 5.6%, Malaysia 3.1%, England, 2.8%, Hong Kong 2.1% and Italy 1.6%.

Two-thirds (66.1%) of people living in Donvale speak English only. The other top languages spoken were Mandarin 6.3%, Cantonese 6.1%, Italian 3.1%, Greek 2.9% and Persian 1.4%.

In terms of religious affiliation, 29.3% indicated no religion, 22.6% indicated Catholic, 8.6% indicated Anglican, 7.9% did not state a religion and 5.9% indicated Eastern Orthodox.

Education
 Donvale Christian College 
 Donvale Primary School
 Heatherwood School
 Our Lady of the Pines Primary School
 Whitefriars College

Notable people who live/have lived in Donvale
Sam Collins - AFL footballer
 Raymond Edmunds – Mr. Stinky (The Donvale Rapist) – Murderer
Marc Murphy - AFL footballer
 Christian Petracca - AFL player and Norm Smith Medallist
 Paul Roos – AFL Coach and Footballer
 Virginia Trioli – News Presenter
 Karl von Möller – cinematographer and director

Points of interest and historical significance
 Yarran Dheran – Bushland
 Currawong Bush Park – Riparian bushland park
 Antonio Park
 Limassol Court
 Mullum Mullum Stadium And Surrounding Bushlands

Sport
The suburb has two Australian Rules football teams. The first is the Donvale Magpies, competing in the Eastern Football League. The second is the Donvale Crusaders, who compete in the Saturday Football League. However, their home ground is shard with the Mitcham Eagles Football Club, at Heatherdale Reserve, Mitcham, Victoria.

Donvale also has an indoor sports centre, with a gymnasium, complete with a sprung floor and a foam pit. The centre also has two basketball courts, which are played on every Saturday by the children in the Doncaster District Primary School Basketball Association.

See also
 City of Doncaster and Templestowe – Donvale was previously within this former local government area.

References

Suburbs of Melbourne
Suburbs of the City of Manningham